Kirtling, together with Kirtling Green and Kirtling Towers, is a scattered settlement in the south-eastern edge of the English county of Cambridgeshire. It forms a civil parish with the nearby village of Upend to its north. The population of the settlement is included in the civil parish of Woodditton.

Heritage
From the 16th to the 19th centuries, Kirtling was known as Catlidge. Upend was originally called Upheme – old English for "the up-dwelling". Upend may once have been a separate village, but it had been absorbed into Kirtling before 1066. By 1086, Kirtling had become the most heavily populated parish in the neighbourhood.

A rich Cambridgeshire landowner named Oswi and his wife Leofflaed gave the parish of Kirtling to Ely Abbey around 1000. It later belonged to Earl (later King) Harold, who died in 1066. By 1086 it was probably held by an Englishman named Frawine of Kirtling.

All Saints Parish Church is a Grade I listed building, dating back to the 13th century. Kirtling Tower is also a Grade I listed building, its gatehouse built about 1530 by Edward North, 1st Baron North. Dudley North, 4th Baron North, politician and polymath, was buried at Kirtling on 27 June 1677. His granddaughter Dudleya North, an orientalist and linguist, was buried here in 1712.

John Crichton-Stuart, 2nd Marquess of Bute built almshouses in Kirtling in 1842 in memory of his late wife Lady Maria (died 1841).

Population
The population of the parish peaked at 909 in 1851, then fell below 800 in 1880, 600 in 1910, 500 in 1930 and to 300 in 1971. The population (including Upend) at the 2011 census was 327.

References

External links

 Detailed BBC website about the parish church

Villages in Cambridgeshire
Civil parishes in Cambridgeshire
Burial sites of the Stuart of Bute family
East Cambridgeshire District